Thanatus is a genus of false crab spiders described by Carl Ludwig Koch in 1837, belonging to the order Araneae, family Philodromidae.

Species of this genus are present in most of Europe.

Adult members of this genus of spiders can reach  in length and can mostly be encountered above the soil surface (epigeal organism) on low vegetation.

The members of this genus have a clear leaf-like cardiac mark on the anterior dorsal elongated abdomen. They are very similar to Philodromus species, but they can mainly be distinguished by differences in the eyes.

Species
This genus includes approximately 100 species:

 Thanatus africanus Karsch, 1878
 Thanatus albescens O. P.-Cambridge, 1885
 Thanatus alpinus Kulczyński, 1887
 Thanatus altimontis Gertsch, 1933
 Thanatus arcticus Thorell, 1872
 Thanatus arenarius Thorell, 1872
 Thanatus arenicola (Schmidt, 1976)
 Thanatus aridorum Silhavy, 1940
 Thanatus atlanticus Berland, 1936
 Thanatus atratus Simon, 1875
 Thanatus balestrerii Caporiacco, 1935
 Thanatus bungei (Kulczynski, 1908)
 Thanatus chorillensis Keyserling, 1880
 Thanatus coloradensis Keyserling, 1880
 Thanatus constellatus Charitonov, 1946
 Thanatus coreanus Paik, 1979
 Thanatus cronebergi Simon, 1895
 Thanatus dahurianus Logunov, 1997
 Thanatus denisi Brignoli, 1983
 Thanatus dhakuricus Tikader, 1960
 Thanatus dissimilis Denis, 1960
 Thanatus dorsilineatus Jézéquel, 1964
 Thanatus fabricii (Audouin, 1826)
 Thanatus firmetorum Muster & Thaler, 2003
 Thanatus flavescens O. P.-Cambridge, 1876
 Thanatus flavidus Simon, 1875
 Thanatus flavus O. P.-Cambridge, 1876
 Thanatus forbesi Pocock, 1903
 Thanatus formicinus (Clerck, 1757)
 Thanatus fornicatus Simon, 1897
 Thanatus frederici Denis, 1941
 Thanatus fuscipes Denis, 1957
 Thanatus gigas (C.L. Koch, 1837)
 Thanatus gnaquiensis Strand, 1908
 Thanatus granadensis Keyserling, 1880
 Thanatus hongkong Song, Zhu & Wu, 1997
 Thanatus imbecillus L. Koch, 1878
 Thanatus inconsuetus Caporiacco, 1940
 Thanatus indicus Simon, 1885
 Thanatus jabalpurensis Gajbe & Gajbe, 1999
 Thanatus jaikensis Ponomarev, 2007
 Thanatus jugorum Simon, 1916
 Thanatus ketani Bhandari & Gajbe, 2001
 Thanatus kitabensis Charitonov, 1946
 Thanatus lamottei Jézéquel, 1964
 Thanatus lanatus Logunov, 1996
 Thanatus lanceolatus Simon, 1875
 Thanatus lanceoletus Tikader, 1966
 Thanatus lesserti (Roewer, 1951)
 Thanatus lineatipes Simon, 1870
 Thanatus luederitzi Simon, 1910
 Thanatus maculatus Keyserling, 1880
 Thanatus mandali Tikader, 1965
 Thanatus meronensis Levy, 1977
 Thanatus mikhailovi Logunov, 1996
 Thanatus miniaceus Simon, 1880
 Thanatus mongolicus (Schenkel, 1936)
 Thanatus multipunctatus Strand, 1906
 Thanatus mus Strand, 1908
 Thanatus namaquensis Simon, 1910
 Thanatus neimongol Wu & Song, 1987
 Thanatus nigromaculatus Kulczynski, 1885
 Thanatus nipponicus Yaginuma, 1969
 Thanatus nitidus  Logunov & Kunt, 2010
 Thanatus oblongiusculus (Lucas, 1846) - Southern Europe, Turkey, North Africa, Ukraine, Russia (Europe) to Central Asia, Iran, China
 Thanatus okayi Karol, 1966
 Thanatus ornatus (Lucas, 1846)
 Thanatus pagenstecheri Strand, 1906
 Thanatus parangvulgaris Barrion & Litsinger, 1995
 Thanatus paucipunctatus Strand, 1906
 Thanatus philodromicus Strand, 1916
 Thanatus philodromoides Caporiacco, 1940
 Thanatus pictus L. Koch, 1881
 Thanatus pinnatus Jézéquel, 1964
 Thanatus plumosus Simon, 1890
 Thanatus prolixus Simon, 1897
 Thanatus pygmaeus Schmidt & Krause, 1996
 Thanatus rayi Simon, 1875
 Thanatus rubicellus Mello-Leitão, 1929
 Thanatus rubicundus L. Koch, 1875
 Thanatus sabulosus (Menge, 1875)
 Thanatus saraevi Ponomarev, 2007
 Thanatus schubotzi Strand, 1913
 Thanatus sepiacolor Levy, 1999
 Thanatus setiger (O. P.-Cambridge, 1872)
 Thanatus sibiricus Kulczynski, 1901
 Thanatus simplicipalpis Simon, 1882
 Thanatus stepposus Logunov, 1996
 Thanatus striatus C. L. Koch, 1845
 Thanatus stripatus Tikader, 1980
 Thanatus tuvinensis Logunov, 1996
 Thanatus ubsunurensis Logunov, 1996
 Thanatus validus Simon, 1875
 Thanatus vulgaris Simon, 1870
 Thanatus wuchuanensis Tang & Wang, 2008
 Thanatus xinjiangensis Hu & Wu, 1989
 Thanatus zavattarii Caporiacco, 1939

References

External links
 Fauna Europaea
 Biolib
 Bugguide
 Philodromidae

Philodromidae
Araneomorphae genera
Cosmopolitan spiders
Taxa named by Carl Ludwig Koch